Leandro Arturo Cedeño (born August 22, 1998) is a Venezuelan professional baseball first baseman for the Orix Buffaloes of Nippon Professional Baseball (NPB).

Career

St. Louis Cardinals
On August 29, 2014, Cedeño signed with the St. Louis Cardinals organization as an international free agent. He made his professional debut with the Dominican Summer League Cardinals, appearing in 74 games for the team from 2015 to 2016.

After playing in only 9 games for the rookie-level GCL Cardinals in 2017, Cedeño spent the 2018 season with the rookie-level Johnson City Cardinals, playing in 59 games and hitting .336/.419/.592 with career-highs in home runs (14) and RBI (47). In 2019, Cedeño played in 100 games for the Single-A Peoria Chiefs, slashing .271/.311/.396 with 6 home runs and 44 RBI. He did not play in a game in 2020 due to the cancellation of the minor league season because of the COVID-19 pandemic. Cedeño split the 2021 season between Peoria and the Double-A Springfield Cardinals, batting a cumulative .260/.316/.427 with 12 home runs and 60 RBI across 96 games. He elected free agency following the season on November 7, 2021.

Arizona Diamondbacks
On November 22, 2021, Cedeño signed a minor league contract with the Arizona Diamondbacks organization. He was assigned to the Double-A Amarillo Sod Poodles to begin the 2022 season. He hit a  home run for Amarillo on July 17, 2022, the longest measured since the debut of Statcast in 2015. Cedeño enjoyed a career year with Amarillo, hitting an excellent .310/.374/.563 with new career-highs in home runs (30) and RBI (93). This led to him being promoted to Triple-A for the first time on September 6. He played in 14 games for the Triple-A Reno Aces, hitting .291/.328/.436 while adding on 2 more home runs and 10 more RBI. Cedeño became a free agent following the season on November 10, 2022.

Orix Buffaloes
On December 27, 2022, Cedeño signed with the Orix Buffaloes of Nippon Professional Baseball.

References

External links

Living people
1998 births
People from Guatire
Venezuelan baseball players
Dominican Summer League Cardinals players
Gulf Coast Cardinals players
Johnson City Cardinals players
Peoria Chiefs players
Caribes de Anzoátegui players
Springfield Cardinals players
Leones del Caracas players
Amarillo Sod Poodles players
Reno Aces players